Nazavyziv is a village located in Nadvirna Raion in Ivano-Frankivsk Oblast in western Ukraine. It belongs to Nadvirna urban hromada, one of the hromadas of Ukraine. The population of the 2001 census was 1,895 people. Nazavyziv covers an area of 62.46 km². Zip code is 78425.

History
The first written mention of the village dates back to 1479. The tax register of 1515 in the village documents a mill and 4 fields (about 100 hectares) of arable land.

References

External links
 Nazavyziv page on the website of the Nadvirna district council

Villages in Nadvirna Raion